The Hangover is a trilogy of American comedy films created by Jon Lucas and Scott Moore, and directed by Todd Phillips. All three films follow the misadventures of a quartet of friends (also known as "the Wolfpack") who go on their road trip to attend a bachelor party. While all of the films finds three of the four men on a mission to find their missing friend, the first two films focus on the events, after the night of debauchery before a party in Las Vegas and Bangkok, whereas the third and final film involves a road trip and a kidnapping in lieu of a bachelor party. Each film in the series focuses on how the friends deal with the aftermath of their antics, while they are being humiliated and occasionally physically beaten up at every turn. All three films were released from 2009 to 2013, and have grossed a collective total of $1.4 billion in the United States and worldwide.

Films

The Hangover (2009) 

Phil Wenneck, Stu Price and Alan Garner, travel to Las Vegas for a bachelor party to celebrate the impending marriage of their friend, Doug Billings. However, Phil, Stu, and Alan have no memory of the previous night's events and must find Doug before the wedding can take place.

Lucas and Moore wrote the script after hearing how a friend of executive producer Chris Bender went missing following his bachelor party in Las Vegas. After Lucas and Moore sold it to Warner Bros. for $2 million, Phillips and Jeremy Garelick rewrote the script to include a tiger, a subplot involving a baby and a police cruiser, and real-life boxer Mike Tyson. Filming took place in Nevada for fifteen days.

The Hangover Part II (2011)

Phil, Stu, Alan and Doug, travel to Thailand for Stu's wedding. After the previous film's bachelor party in Las Vegas, Stu takes no chances and opts for a safe, subdued pre-wedding brunch. However, things do not go as planned, resulting in another hangover with no memories of the previous night. After losing Teddy, Stu's future brother-in-law, Phil, Stu and Alan search for him in Bangkok.

Warner Bros. hired Phillips and Scot Armstrong to write a sequel to The Hangover after a trailer brought down the house at ShoWest in April 2009, two months before the film was released. The principal actors were cast in March 2010 to reprise their roles from the first film. Production began in October 2010, in Ontario, California, before moving on location in Thailand.

The Hangover Part III (2013)

Phil, Stu and Doug are happily living uneventful lives at home. The only member of the Wolfpack who is not content is Alan. Still lacking a sense of purpose, Alan has ditched his meds and given in to his natural impulses until the untimely death of his father forces him to finally re-evaluate his lifestyle and seek the help he needs. Phil, Stu and Doug are there to make sure Alan takes the first step. This time, Alan marries Cassandra, and resigns from The Wolfpack, but things still go awry when the Wolfpack hits the road.

Phillips first announced plans for a third film in May 2011, days before the release of The Hangover Part II. Craig Mazin, who co-wrote Part II, was also brought on board in May to script the film. The principal actors signed on in January 2012 and production began in September 2012 in Los Angeles, California, before moving to Nogales, Arizona, and Las Vegas, Nevada. The film was released on May 23, 2013.

Future 
On October 21, 2021 Zach Galifianakis said in an interview that a fourth film could happen if it would be a "Pixar family-friendly version". He then added: “I’ve written a lot of it, but I sent it to the other guys, they sent me videos of them burning it.”.

Cast

Reception

Box office performance

Critical and public response

References

External links
 The Hangover franchise at Box Office Mojo

 
Films about weddings
Film series introduced in 2009
American comedy films
Warner Bros. Pictures franchises